Lawrence Township is the name of some places in the U.S. state of Minnesota:

Lawrence Township, Grant County, Minnesota
Lawrence Township, Itasca County, Minnesota

See also
Lawrence Township (disambiguation)

Minnesota township disambiguation pages